Dishy may refer to:

 Bob Dishy (born 1934) U.S. actor
 "Dishy" Rishi Sunak (born 1980) UK politician
 Dishy McFlatface, the satellite dish antenna for SpaceX's Starlink satellite internet

See also

 Mister Dishey, a character from the TV show Pucca; see List of Pucca characters
 Dishi, Imperial Preceptor
 Dyshi, 2007 song
 Dyche (surname)

 Dish (disambiguation)
 Disher
 Dished
 DiShIn